Yale-East was a provincial electoral district in the British Columbia legislature that appeared only in the 1894, 1898 and 1900 elections.  It and its sister ridings Yale-West and Yale-North were created from the older three-member Yale (provincial electoral district), which was one of the province's first twelve ridings as of 1871.  For the 1903 election the riding-name Yale was restored on an adapted version of Yale-West.  The area of Yale-East is now part of various ridings in the Nicola, Similkameen and Okanagan areas.

Election results 
Note: Winners of each election are in bold.

|-

|- bgcolor="white"
!align="right" colspan=3|Total valid votes
!align="right"|821
!align="right"|100.00%
!align="right"|
|- bgcolor="white"
!align="right" colspan=3|Total rejected ballots
!align="right"|
!align="right"|
!align="right"|
|- bgcolor="white"
!align="right" colspan=3|Turnout
!align="right"|%
!align="right"|
!align="right"|
|}

|-

|- bgcolor="white"
!align="right" colspan=3|Total valid votes
!align="right"|888
!align="right"|100.00%
!align="right"|
|- bgcolor="white"
!align="right" colspan=3|Total rejected ballots
!align="right"|
!align="right"|
!align="right"|
|- bgcolor="white"
!align="right" colspan=3|Turnout
!align="right"|%
!align="right"|
!align="right"|
|}

|-

|- bgcolor="white"
!align="right" colspan=3|Total valid votes
!align="right"|1,105
!align="right"|100.00%
!align="right"|
|- bgcolor="white"
!align="right" colspan=3|Total rejected ballots
!align="right"|
!align="right"|
!align="right"|
|- bgcolor="white"
!align="right" colspan=3|Turnout
!align="right"|%
!align="right"|
!align="right"|
|}

Former provincial electoral districts of British Columbia